EDNY may refer to:

The United States District Court for the Eastern District of New York
The ICAO code for Friedrichshafen Airport, Germany
Jameel Edny, a baseball player on the 2015 Bethune–Cookman Wildcats baseball team
Alexander Moffat, Commendator of Edny; born 1590 in Scotland
 Edny, an alternative form for Udny of Aberdeenshire

See also